Jak 3 is a 2004 action-adventure video game developed by Naughty Dog and published by Sony Computer Entertainment for the PlayStation 2. The game is the sequel to Jak II, the third game in the series and serves as the conclusion of the  trilogy. The game picks up after the events of the previous games and the player takes on the dual role of recurring protagonists Jak and Daxter. It adds new weapons, devices and playable areas. The game was followed by Jak X: Combat Racing.

Gameplay 

Like its predecessor, the gameplay of Jak 3 is a blend of platforming, driving, and gun combat. The player is led through the story as they complete missions, assigned by the various characters in the game. Missions can consist of anything from defeating particular enemies, reaching a specific location, or completing a puzzle. With the exception of timed or otherwise linear missions, the player is free to explore the massive game world as they see fit.

Secrets, made available as the player progresses and collects elusive Precursor orbs, can be purchased and toggled, allowing the player to access "cheats" such as upgraded weapons damage, world mirroring, or invincibility. After the game has been completed, the Hero Mode option is made accessible, which, when purchased, allows the player to replay the game at a higher difficulty level, but with all previously unlocked cheats and extras still available. As the Precursor Orb count is not reset, and the orbs are regenerated at their original locations, the player is able to regather orbs that they had already collected the previous time they played through the game. Collecting all 600 Precursor Orbs has some cosmetic effects on Jak's appearance, but has no effects other than this. In Hero Mode, Jak also keeps all twelve of his weapons but loses his light flight along with two of his dark powers until they are collected in their respective parts of the game.

There are some differences between Jak 3 and Jak II. Most notably are the changes undergone in the Haven City environments. Spargus City, the Wasteland, and Haven City function as the main hubs in Jak 3, where leaper lizards, buggies, and zoomers respectively are the main sources of transportation. While Jak II provided the player with only four different types of guns, Jak 3 expands on the concept with two additional modifications for each gun giving Jak a powerful loadout of twelve weapons. Also, the "Dark Jak" form, introduced in Jak II, which allowed the player to transform into a more powerful offensive version of Jak, is countered by a "Light Jak" form that mainly focuses on defensive abilities. The jet-board makes a return appearance from Jak II to this game, with some additional upgrades as well.

Plot

Setting 
Like its predecessors, Jak 3 takes place in an unnamed fictional universe created by Naughty Dog specially for the games. The game is set a year after the events of Jak II. Jak 3 largely focuses on the Wasteland, a large desert only briefly referred to in the previous entry in the series as being completely uninhabited and inhospitable.

Spargus City, a large settlement within the Wasteland bordering the ocean, is where the game begins, and serves as a hub for the player, where new weapons and upgrades can be earned, and most missions are given out. Later on, the plot shifts focus to Haven City, a sprawling metropolis which was the central locale in Jak II, though the area is only one-fifth the size of the Wasteland. Some levels from the previous game are radically altered (Haven Forest, Metropolitan area) or removed entirely (like the Bazaar in Haven City), while others are added (New Haven City), branching off from Spargus and the Wasteland and Haven.

Characters 

As in the games before it, Jak 3 two main protagonists are Jak and his best friend Daxter the ottsel, which is a fictional hybrid between an otter and a weasel. Jak is revealed to have the birth name of Mar in this game, named after his ancestor and the original founder of Haven City, Mar. Jak's mechanic friend (and potential love interest) Keira returns in this game. There is also Ashelin, the Governor of Haven City, who was previously involved with Torn, the now-commander of the Freedom League. Daxter's love interest Tess returns as a weapons designer; and Jak's mentor, Samos, also makes appearances throughout the game.

A new character, Damas, is first introduced here. It is revealed that not only did Damas lose his son, but was the leader of Haven City before being betrayed by Baron Praxis and being banished to the desert. More minor but returning characters include Sig, a spy for Damas back in Haven City who later becomes the new king of Spargus after Damas is killed, Jinx, a former member of the Underground, Vin, whose brain now resides inside a computer and Pecker, Onin's translator from Jak II becomes an adviser to Damas in the early parts of the game.

Few of the original antagonists from Jak II reappear in this game. A new secondary villain is Count Veger, a self-absorbed Haven City aristocrat who banishes Jak to the Wasteland at the beginning of the game. The player later finds that Veger attacked the Palace himself, wishing to journey to the core of the planet and gain the power of the Precursors. Even as he attempts this, a species known as the Dark Makers begin to invade the planet, seeking to destroy it. The Dark Makers are Precursors who have been corrupted by Dark Eco, similar to the antagonists of The Precursor Legacy.

The main antagonist is the former Krimzon Guard commander Errol, first introduced in Jak II, renamed Cyber-Errol. He is a cybernetic version of himself, as he was badly wounded in Jak II when he crashed into a supply of Eco barrels in an attempt to kill Jak. Sometime before the start of this game, he restarts the manufacturing of Krimzon Guard Deathbots, whose original factory was shut down during the events of the previous game. Errol launches a war against Haven City in tandem with the remaining Metal Head monsters, and later forges an alliance with the Dark Makers. He obtains a massive Dark Maker terraforming robot at the end of the game, with which he attempts to destroy the planet. The Terraformer is destroyed by Jak as it advances through the Wasteland towards Spargus City.

Story 
The game begins with Jak and Daxter being banished into the Wasteland by the tyrannical Count Veger for supposed crimes against Haven City. Ashelin, who opposes the banishment, gives Jak a beacon before she leaves and tells him to "stay alive". As they travel through the desert, flashbacks reveal that Haven City is at war between the Freedom League and the surviving Metal Heads and their allies, the KG Death Bots. The Palace is then destroyed by an unknown force. As Jak, Daxter, and Pecker lose consciousness, they are rescued by a group of desert-dwellers, who take them back to Spargus City.

Waking up in Spargus, the King, Damas, says that Jak must earn his place in the civilization by proving himself as a warrior in both the Arena challenges and by serving the city, who his "life now belongs to" for being rescued. His missions involve recovering citizens and artifacts during or after sandstorms, racing both buggies and Leaper lizards for upgrades, solving puzzles for Eco crystals, catching Kanga rats upon a Leaper lizard, and several other odd jobs in the oasis city. Most important among these events is that Jak is bestowed Light Eco abilities to balance the darkness within, granted to him at the Precursor temple by an oracle who believes that Jak is the last hope for civilization. His Light powers include time-slowing abilities, healing powers, shield abilities, and even flight. Along the way, Jak befriends the Precursor Monk, Seem, and a buggy garage owner, Kliever—who initially dislikes him until he gains their trust over time. During one of Damas's missions into the desert, Jak is found by Ashelin, who reveals that she knew Damas would find him since she knew he would check his old beacons. She refuses to tell him how she knows Damas and then begs Jak to come back to Haven City to defend it from the Metal Heads and the new Krimzon Guard Deathbots. Still embittered about being exiled, he refuses to return. Ashelin leaves him, but later, after finding out what the evil Count Veger has in store for his friends, Jak changes his mind and makes the journey via transport to Haven City. Jak and Daxter help reunite the resistance in Haven, who were divided due to barriers put up by enemies, and gives them hope that they can beat back the Metal Heads and Deathbots to reclaim their city.

Partway through the game, Jak and Daxter start to encounter strange creatures. A Precursor telescope in the outskirts of Haven City reveals that the beings are Dark Makers, who were once Precursors, but exposure to Dark Eco transformed them into twisted beings. Jak finds that a purple star in the sky is actually a Dark Maker space ship, and it is nearing the planet. The only way to stop the ship is to activate the planetary defense system situated at the core of the planet, and after defeating the Metal Heads and Deathbots in Haven City, Jak and Daxter begin their trek through the catacombs to the Planet Core.

Damas joins them as they burst through a destroyed section of the city searching for a way to the core. In the battle, Damas is crushed underneath a buggy and fatally injured. In his last moments, he asks Jak to find his long-lost son, Mar, and gives him an amulet bearing the seal of Mar to identify him. Remembering his younger self from the events of Jak II, Jak realizes that Damas is his father, but Damas dies before Jak can tell him. Veger arrives and tells Jak that it's true, and he took Jak when he was a small boy away from Damas for his eco powers before Praxis banished Damas and seized control of Haven. Veger then rushes off to the core and Jak follows him, hungry for revenge.

Once there, they seem to have beaten Veger, and the Precursor entity tells Jak that he has earned the right to evolve into one of them. Veger, however, emerges from the shadows and takes the power for himself. However, it is soon revealed that Precursors are actually ottsels who are simply fluffing up the myth to match their appearance with their abilities. A baffled Veger is transformed into an ottsel, effectively as punishment for his actions. The Precursors send Jak and Daxter to the Dark Maker ship to slow it down while the planetary defense system charges. The mission is a success, but as the ship is breaking apart, a gigantic, spider-legged Dark Maker terraformer commanded by the Deathbot leader, Errol, escapes from the ship and descends to the planet. Jak follows, and after a battle, Errol and the Robot are destroyed.

Back in Spargus, Sig is put on the throne and Jak departs with the Precursors to see the universe. However, after the ship takes off, he emerges from the shadows and says that there was no way he could leave Daxter behind, not with "all their adventures ahead".

Development and release 
Jak 3 was developed by Naughty Dog for the PlayStation 2. Jak 3 was first revealed to be in the works by one of Superplay writers on January 8, 2004. While browsing the Naughty Dog offices, he saw early work being done with desert environments. It was first announced by Sony Computer Entertainment on February 24, 2004. On April 19, 2004, information was revealed about the plot and gameplay. The voice-acting was jointly recorded in the Los Angeles-based Pop Sound and the New York City-based Howard Schwartz Recording. It was released in North America on November 9, 2004, and in Europe on November 26, 2004.

Soundtrack

The original soundtrack for the game, Jak 3: Official Soundtrack, composed by Josh Mancell and Larry Hopkins, was released on CD by Sony Computer Entertainment as an exclusive product for the Limited Run Games collector's edition of Jak 3, on April 26, 2019.

Reception 

Jak 3 received "generally positive reviews", according to review aggregator Metacritic. GameSpot gave it a score of 8.6/10, "Jak 3 is a game with exceptional production values and some of the nicest visuals on the PlayStation 2" and went on to praise the "Solid platforming action with even more weapons and abilities, tons of varied gameplay types, engrossing and well-told storyline, the trademark humor and plenty of unlockable secrets." Other praises have been given to the game for being reasonably easier in difficulty compared to its predecessor—which received common criticism for its insufficient number of checkpoints.

IGN said: "If you're looking for art and technical achievement, Jak has it…Jak is it. Characters animate so smoothly it actually makes playing other games painful. Painful, I say! And it never stutters, never glitches, never hitches, and never, ever lets up" and gave it a score of 9.6/10. It received a runner-up position in GameSpot's 2004 "Best Platformer" award category across all platforms, losing to Ratchet & Clank: Up Your Arsenal.

On August 4, 2005, the game was added to the Greatest Hits collection.

Ports and remasters
In 2012, Jak 3 was remastered in the Jak and Daxter Collection on the PlayStation 3, with the collection releasing on the PlayStation Vita a year later. In 2017, Jak 3 was ported to the PlayStation 4.

References

External links 

 
 
 

2004 video games
Alien invasions in video games
Cyberpunk video games
Dystopian video games
Jak and Daxter
Naughty Dog games
Open-world video games
PlayStation 2 games
PlayStation 2-only games
Single-player video games
Video games developed in the United States
Video games scored by Josh Mancell
Video game sequels
Video games set on fictional planets
3D platform games